The 1904 Penn Quakers football team was an American football team that represented the University of Pennsylvania as an independent during the 1904 college football season. In their third season under head coach Carl S. Williams, the Quakers compiled a 12–0 record, shut out 11 of 12 opponents, and outscored all opponents by a total of 222 to 4.

There was no contemporaneous system in 1904 for determining a national champion. However, Penn was retroactively named as the national champion by the Helms Athletic Foundation, Houlgate System, and Parke H. Davis, and as the co-national champion by the National Championship Foundation.

Three Penn players, quarterback Vince Stevenson, fullback Andy Smith, and guard Frank Piekarski, were consensus picks on the 1904 All-America college football team. Other notable players included halfback Marshall Reynolds, end Garfield Weede, center Robert Grant Torrey, and tackle Thomas Alexander Butkiewicz.

Schedule

References

Penn
Penn Quakers football seasons
College football national champions
College football undefeated seasons
Penn Quakers football